Sadiqur Rahman Chowdhury was a retired Bangladesh Army major general and former Director General of Bangladesh Rifles.

Career 
In the late 1950s and the early 1960s, Chowdhury played at the Azad Sporting Club and patronized the Sonali Otit Club.

Chowdhury was commission on 14 October 1961 in the Pakistan Army as part of the 24th Long Course of the Pakistan Military Academy.

In 1981, Chowdhury served as the Military Secretary of the President of Bangladesh.

From 30 March 1982 to 11 August 1983, chairperson the Cadet Colleges Governing Body.

Chowdhury served as the chairman of the National Sports Council in 1983. Chowdhury was an advisor of Muktijoddha Sangsad in 1984. In 1985, he was the General officer commanding of the 55th Infantry Division. In 1987, he was the chief coordinator of the government efforts during the 1987 flood in Bangladesh. He was the General officer commanding of the 11th Infantry Division based in Bogra Cantonment. In 1988, he was the Zonal Martial Law Administrator (ZMLA) of zone E in Jessore Area. He led a Bangladeshi delegation to Pakistan and met President Muhammad Zia-ul-Haq. From 1 July 1988 to 23 September 1990, Chowdhury served as the Director General of Bangladesh Rifles. From 1987 to 1990, he served as the chairman of the National Sports Council.

Death 
Chowdhury died on 3 November 2008 at the Combined Military Hospital and was buried Banani Military Graveyard.

References 

Director Generals of Border Guards Bangladesh
Bangladesh Army generals
Bangladeshi military personnel
2008 deaths